PT-796 is a 78-foot PT boat built by Higgins Industries of New Orleans in 1945.  It was designated a National Historic Landmark in 1986 as one of a very few surviving World War II PT boats. A "Higgins" boat, she is part of the collection of the PT Boat Museum, which itself is part of the Battleship Cove museum in Fall River, Massachusetts.

Design
PT-796 was laid down on 3 May 1945, launched on 23 June, and completed after the end of the war on 26 October. The last of her type to be constructed, she was nicknamed Tail Ender.

The hull was constructed of two layers of planking. Unlike earlier PT boats, where the layers were laid diagonally, the outer layer of PT-796s hull is laid longitudinally, a change to the design believed to have been made to Higgins boats sometime in late 1944. Also, instead of two layers of mahogany, the inner layer is spruce. The two layers are held together by copper rivets and bronze screws, with a sheet of canvas impregnated with marine glue between them.

The boat was armed with four  Mark 13 torpedoes on roll-off racks,  and  guns in the bows, a Bofors 40 mm gun at the stern, and two twin .50 caliber M2 Browning machine guns in mounts each side of the cockpit. She was also fitted with two Mark 50  rocket launchers, and a smoke generator at the stern.

Ship history
Placed in service too late to take part in World War II, PT-796 saw temporary post-war duty as part of MTB Squadron 1, patrolling in the Caribbean and off the East Coast. She was reclassified as a "Small Boat" on 16 November 1945. Stripped of armament she was then assigned to the Navy Operational Development Force and Naval Ship Research Development Laboratory in Panama City, Florida, where she was used for high-speed towing experiments during the development of equipment for use in riverine operations. The boat was placed out of service on 7 July 1970, and signed over to PT Boats, Inc. Restored to her original configuration, and has been displayed at Battleship Cove since 14 August 1975.

See also
National Register of Historic Places listings in Fall River, Massachusetts
List of National Historic Landmarks in Massachusetts

References

External links
 The Naval History Museum at Battleship Cove
 National Park Service : PT BOAT 796

1945 ships
796
Buildings and structures in Fall River, Massachusetts
National Historic Landmarks in Massachusetts
Museum ships in Massachusetts
Ships on the National Register of Historic Places in Massachusetts
National Register of Historic Places in Fall River, Massachusetts